
Gmina Sianów is an urban-rural gmina (administrative district) in Koszalin County, West Pomeranian Voivodeship, in north-western Poland.

Villages
Apart from the town of Sianów, Gmina Sianów contains the villages and settlements of Bielkowo, Borowiec, Dąbrowa, Gorzebądz, Grabówko, Gracz, Iwięcino, Karnieszewice, Kędzierzyn, Kleszcze, Kłos, Kołzin, Kościerza, Krzykacz, Maszkowo, Mokre, Osieki, Płonka, Przytok, Ratajki, Rzepkowo, Sieciemin, Siecieminek, Sierakówko, Sierakowo Sławieńskie, Skibienko, Skibno, Skwierzynka, Sowieński Młyn, Sowno, Sucha Koszalińska, Suszka, Szczeglino, Szczeglino Nowe, Trawica, Węgorzewo Koszalińskie, Wierciszewo and Wonieść.

Neighbouring gminas
Gmina Sianów is bordered by the city of Koszalin and by the gminas of Będzino, Darłowo, Malechowo, Manowo, Mielno and Polanów.

References
Polish official population figures 2006

Sianow
Koszalin County